In plant science, the disease package of a cultivar is the susceptibility/resistance of that cultivar, in vague overall terms. It is not precise in the absolute sense but is meant to be useful when comparing one cultivar to another, relatively.

References

Plant pathogens and diseases